Maria Augusta Labatut Stresser (born 28 September 1972), known professionally as Guta Stresser, is a Brazilian actress, writer, and theatre director.

Filmography

Television

 2001-2014 – A Grande Família - Bebel (Maria Isabel Silva Carrara)
 2015 - Amorteamo - Cândida
 2015–Present - Mister Brau - Maria Augusta

Cinema
 2001 - A Partilha - Célia
 2004 - Nina - Nina
 2004 - Redeemer - Flávia
 2006 - Balada das Duas Mocinhas de Botafogo - Marília
 2007 - A Grande Família - O Filme - Bebel
 2008 - Sexo Virtual
 2008 - Vingança
 2012 - Tudo que Deus Criou

References

External links 
  Guta Stresser Official Website

1972 births
Living people
Brazilian people of German descent
Actresses from Curitiba
Brazilian stage actresses
Brazilian television actresses